Der Yid ("The Jew") is a New York-based Yiddish-language weekly newspaper, founded in 1953. The newspaper is published by Satmar Hasidim, but is widely read within the broader Yiddish-speaking Haredi community. It uses a Yiddish dialect common to Satmar Hasidim, as opposed to "YIVO Yiddish", which is standard in secular and academic circles.

History 

Der Yid was founded in 1953 by Dr. Aaron Rosmarin as a fortnightly paper. He was formerly an editor of the Yiddish newspaper Der Morgn-Zhurnal ("The Morning Journal"). After the paper was bought out in 1953 by a rival Yiddish newspaper, Der Tog ("The Day"), forming the Tog-Morgn-Zhurnal ("The Day-Morning Journal"), he was laid off from the new company. Rosmarin decided to start his own newspaper.

Religiously observant, Dr. Rosmarin had run columns on the biographies of rabbis and Jewish customs while working for The Morning Journal. Under his influence, Der Yid was considered more sympathetic to Haredi Judaism than the other major Yiddish newspapers of the time. The first editor of Der Yid was the writer Uriel Zimmer, publisher of an anti-Zionist tract.

In 1955, during a Satmar protest at the Manhattan Center against the establishment of a night club in Jerusalem, the Krasna Rav, Rabbi Hillel Lichtenstein, publicly tore up a copy of Der Morgn-Zhurnal as a sign of disapproval of its pro-Zionist stance. Dr. Rosmarin responded with applause. He eventually sold Der Yid to activist leaders of the Satmar community, including Sender Deutsch.

Rabbi Joel Teitelbaum, the Rebbe of Satmar, became the paper's guiding voice, firmly establishing Der Yid as a Haredi and anti-Zionist newspaper. He once approved an appeal for financial contributions to the newspaper on the night of Yom Kippur, as a counterweight to pro-Zionist financial appeals that were commonly held on Yom Kippur.

In 1972, the paper was revamped by Rabbi Chaim Moshe Stauber as a weekly newspaper carrying world news.

Current form 
Der Yid is owned by the supporters of Satmar Rabbi Zalman Teitelbaum. The paper remains firmly anti-Zionist, although some changes have occurred over time. For instance, when the State of Israel is mentioned, it no longer appears in mocking quotation marks. As a matter of course, Der Yid refrains from publishing photographs of women in its pages, in keeping with Hasidic standards of tzniut. According to Tablet Magazine, as of 2018, Der Yid, which is sold in Haredi communities throughout the world, had a circulation of approximately 80,000. However, according to the New York Post, as of 2019, it has a circulation of about 55,000. The newspaper publishes a daily edition, which, according to its website, has 15,000 e-mail subscribers.

The community of Rabbi Aaron Teitelbaum publishes a similar newspaper, known as Der Blatt.

See also
Der Blatt
Di Tzeitung
Hamodia

References

External links
 
 Der Yid daily subscription site

Yiddish-language newspapers published in the United States
Jewish newspapers published in the United States
Jews and Judaism in New York City
Newspapers published in New York City
Satmar (Hasidic dynasty)
Weekly newspapers published in the United States
Non-English-language newspapers published in New York (state)
Yiddish culture in New York (state)